Chestnut Run is a  long 2nd order tributary to Little Mill Creek in New Castle County, Delaware.

Course
Chestnut Run rises on the Brandywine Creek divide at Silverside in New Castle County, Delaware.  Chestnut Run then flows southwest to meet Little Mill Creek at Elsmere, Delaware.

Watershed
Chestnut Run drains  of area, receives about 46.8 in/year of precipitation, has a topographic wetness index of 487.43 and is about 12.4% forested.

See also
List of rivers of Delaware

References 

Rivers of Delaware
Tributaries of the Christina River